In lithic reduction, the striking platform is the surface on the proximal portion of a lithic flake on which the detachment blow falls; this may be natural or prepared. Types of striking platforms include: 

 Cortex, which consists of an area of cortex used as a platform during initial reduction; 
 Single-faceted, consisting of a flat platform at right angles to the dorsal surface of the flake and most often associated with conchoidal fractures; 
 Double-faceted, a variety of multifaceted, prepared platform, also characteristically flat and associated with conchoidal fractures; 
 Multifaceted, with three or more facets to the platform; 
 Lipped, a platform type resulting from soft hammer biface reduction; and 
 Crushed, which occurs when the platform was crushed beyond easy recognition by the detachment blow.

Notes

Lithics